This is a list of alumni of Emmanuel College, Cambridge.

 Choudhary Rahmat Ali
 Peter Bayley
 Charlie Bean
 John Desmond Bernal
 Archie Bland
 Peregrine Bland
 Andrew Bowie, philosopher
 Angus Bowie
 Ajahn Brahm
 Malcolm Brenner
 John Burnett, historian
 Henry Cantrell
 Don Carson, theologian
 Graham Chapman
 Alan J. Charig
 Joe Craig
 Francis Darwin
 Umar Bin Muhammad Daudpota
 Gerald Davies
 Simon Davies, lawyer
 Leonard Dawe
 Walter Duranty
 Gurusaday Dutt
 John Evelyn (1591–1664)
 Sebastian Faulks
 Reo Fortune
 James Fox, art historian
 Michael Frayn
 Graeme Garden
 Edward Pritchard Gee
 Edward George, Baron George
 Dick Greenwood
 Alexander Guttenplan
 Joseph Hall, Bishop
 Clare Hammond
 John Harvard, one of the founders of Harvard College
 Edith Heard, epigenetics researcher
 Freddie Highmore
 Richard Holmes, military historian
 Thomas Hooker
 Jeremiah Horrocks
 Sir Fred Hoyle, astronomer
 Jonathan James-Moore
 Griff Rhys Jones
 Majid Khan (born 1946), cricketer
 Tom King, Baron King of Bridgwater
 F. R. Leavis
 John Lennox
 Wu Lien-teh
 Gordon Luce
 Garry John Martin
 Rory McGrath
 Scott Mead
 Alexander Morrison, judge
 Richard W. Murphy
 Ronald Norrish
 Mary-Ann Ochota
 Maggie O'Farrell
 Lawrence Ogilvie
 C. Northcote Parkinson
 Cecil Parkinson
 Steven Poole
 George Porter
 Karel Reisz
 Hugo Rifkind
 Alan Rouse
 Peter Rubin
 Stephen Sackur
 Birbal Sahni
 William Sancroft
 Bobby Seagull
 Emma Sidi
 Herchel Smith
 Dan Stevens
 Anthony Stone
 Stephen Timms
 William Tobin, astronomer
 Justine Waddell
 John Wallis, mathematician
 Hugh Walpole, novelist
 Thomas Watson
 Eugen Weber
 Bob Wilkinson
 Steve Woolgar
 Tim Yeo
 Benjamin Yeoh
 Thomas Young, polymath
 Edgar Ord Laird, diplomat
 Arthur Robin Adair, diplomat

References

Emmanuel College, Cambridge
 
Emmanuel